Lepidogma ambifaria is a species of snout moth in the genus Lepidogma. It is known from Borneo and Sumatra in Indonesia.

References

Moths described in 1901
Epipaschiinae